Stijn Smulders (born 7 August 1979) is a Belgian rower. He competed in the men's quadruple sculls event at the 2000 Summer Olympics.

References

External links
 

1979 births
Living people
Belgian male rowers
Olympic rowers of Belgium
Rowers at the 2000 Summer Olympics
Sportspeople from Antwerp